In physics and chemistry, the Nernst effect (also termed first Nernst–Ettingshausen effect, after Walther Nernst and Albert von Ettingshausen) is a thermoelectric (or thermomagnetic) phenomenon observed when a sample allowing electrical conduction is subjected to a magnetic field and a temperature gradient normal (perpendicular) to each other. An electric field will be induced normal to both.

This effect is quantified by the Nernst coefficient , which is defined to be

where  is the y-component of the electric field that results from the magnetic field's z-component  and the x-component of the temperature gradient .

The reverse process is known as the Ettingshausen effect and also as the second Nernst–Ettingshausen effect.

Physical picture 

Mobile energy carriers (for example conduction-band electrons in a semiconductor) will move along temperature gradients due to statistics and the relationship
between temperature and kinetic energy. If there is a magnetic field transversal to the temperature gradient and the carriers are electrically charged, they experience a force perpendicular to their direction of motion (also the direction of the temperature gradient) and to the magnetic field. Thus, a perpendicular electric field is induced.

Sample types 

Semiconductors exhibit the Nernst effect. This has been studied in the 1950s by Krylova, Mochan and many others. In metals however, it is almost non-existent. It appears in the vortex phase
of type-II superconductors due to vortex motion. This has been studied by Huebener et al. High-temperature superconductors exhibit the Nernst effect both in the superconducting and in the pseudogap phase, as was first found by Xu et al. Heavy-Fermion superconductors can show a strong Nernst signal which is likely not due to the vortices, as was found by Bel et al.

See also 
 Seebeck effect
 Peltier effect
 Hall effect
 Righi–Leduc effect

Journal articles 

 
 

 
 

Walther Nernst
Electrodynamics
Thermoelectricity